Nadia Tamara Ferreira (born 10 May 1999) is a Paraguayan fashion model and beauty pageant titleholder who was crowned Miss Universe Paraguay 2021. As Miss Universe Paraguay, Ferreira represented Paraguay at Miss Universe 2021, where she placed as the first runner-up. Ferreira had previously been crowned Miss Teen Universe Paraguay 2015, and placed as the third runner-up at Miss Teen Universe 2015. 

As a fashion model, Ferreira first garnered recognition in 2018, after being selected to walk in the F/W 2018 show for Custo Barcelona at New York Fashion Week. She has since appeared in Harper's Bazaar, Cosmopolitan, L'Officiel, and Robb Report Singapore.

Career

Modeling 
Ferreira debuted in a Patrol Jeans commercial and other advertising campaigns.

In an Asunción fashion show, her silk dress slipped and bared her chest, garnering media attention. She said it would have been unprofessional to fix her dress while walking, so she continued with her walk and posture. Her fan club commended her actions.

She walked the runway in many occasions, including the New York Fashion Week, creating an uproar in local and international media from both supporters and critics alike.

She has also walked in fashion shows in Milan, Santiago, Paris, Brasil, Uruguay and Paraguay.

In 2018, she signed with the model agency Wilhelmina, famous for models such as Nicki Minaj, Demi Lovato and Nick Jonas. She was featured in Gettyimages editorial photography.

In March 2019, she released a new photo in her Instagram account announcing she had been selected to appear in Cosmo Fashion Night in Mexico City. In the photo, she was seen walking close to mariachi musicians.

On September 9, 2021, she tripped on her high heels and nearly fell during the Custo Barcelona Spring/Summer 2022 fashion show, held as part of the New York Fashion Week. The incident was widely reported in the media, and several commentators wondered if she had hurt herself, leading her to officially declare that she had only superficial scratches (and a bruised ego).

Television  
Ferreira became a local celebrity after her participation in Telefuturo's Parodiando, a 2015 television show in which participants perform parodies of famous singers, for her parodies of artists like Taylor Swift and Violetta.

Pageantry 
In 2015, Ferreira represented Guairá in Miss Teen Universe Paraguay 2015 and eventually won the title. She represents her country at Miss Teen Universe 2015 which was held in Guatemala and was placed as the third runner-up. On August 31, 2021, Ferreira was appointed as Miss Universe Paraguay 2021. At the end of the event, she succeeded outgoing Miss Universe Paraguay 2020 Vanessa Castro. Ferreira then represented Paraguay at the Miss Universe 2021 pageant in Eilat, Israel, placing as the first runner-up, the highest placement for the country in the history of the pageant to date.

Fashion Week appearances 
 New York Fashion Week
 Milan Fashion Week
 Paris Fashion Week
 Santiago Fashion Week
 Qatar Fashion Week
 Asunción Fashion Week

Personal life
She was engaged to singer Marc Anthony on 13 May 2022. They got married on 28 January 2023., on February 14, in the Valentine's Day, the couple, announces in their instagram account that is expecting to their first boy, the seventh of the american singer and the first of the paraguayan model.

References

External links
 
 

1999 births
Living people
Paraguayan female models
Paraguayan beauty pageant winners
Miss Universe 2021 contestants
People from Villarrica, Paraguay